Eremo di San Colombano is a hermitage in Trambileno, Italy, notable for its location in the side of a mountain.

Some natural caves, halfway up the rock wall of the gorge formed by the stream of Leno Vallarsa were certainly used from 753 (the date inscribed on the rock) from a Monaco hermit.

History 
According to legend, the hermit San Colombano first arrived there and killed the dragon that caused the death of children baptised in the waters of the river below Leno. More likely, the legend was born as a place from the first hermit monks from the nearby monastery of Bobbio, or the Priory of St. Columban Bardolino. Visitation to the site was prescribed during Lent.

The first settlement was the "Grotta degli Eremiti," or "Cave of the Hermits," in an undefined time. The inscription dated 753, engraved on the rock next to the current tower, dates back, however, the continued practice of the monastic hermitage.

Between the late tenth and early eleventh century, records indicate the first construction of a small church dedicated to the saint at the opening of the cave, under a roof of natural rock. The first documentary evidence of the presence of the hermitage and the church is from 1319, relating to a bequest made to the "Church of St. Columba" on the part of Count William of Castelbarco of the House of Lords of Lizzana and Rovereto, and the other, 1470, is still preserved in Lizzana, attesting to the faith of the inhabitants of the place with celebrations and processions to the Irish saint to avert the long drought.

The hermitage or the "hermit's cave" was used by monks, hermits, who were its guardians, until 1782 when the practice of the hermitage was abolished. Since then the place of worship was later cared for by the inhabitants of the valley.

The province of Trent in 1996 restored the church, and the opening to the public is maintained by a group of volunteers gathered in the Committee Friends of St. Columban.

The hermitage is accessed by a staircase of 102 steps carved into rock. Frescoes depict the fight between St. Columba and a dragon (an allegory of the struggle between good and evil), as well as the representation of Paradise, located in the cave. Another fresco with "Madonna and Saints" is the fifteenth-century altar of the church and keeps recordings with prayers and candles dated between 1505 and 1782, witnessed the pilgrimage to the shrine.

References

External links
 Scheda dal sito del Comune di Rovereto
 L'Eremo di San Colombano e la sua Storia

Colombano